Stewart John Fairgrieve is a Canadian politician, who was elected to the Legislative Assembly of New Brunswick in a by-election on October 5, 2015. He represented the electoral district of Carleton as a member of the Progressive Conservatives until 2020 when he retired.

Electoral record

References

External links
 

Living people
Progressive Conservative Party of New Brunswick MLAs
21st-century Canadian politicians
University of New Brunswick alumni
Year of birth missing (living people)